Huajayhuillca (possibly from Quechua waqay to cry, willka Anadenanthera colubrina) is a mountain in the Urubamba mountain range in the Andes of Peru, with an elevation of . It is located in the Cusco Region, La Convención Province, Huayopata District, and in the Urubamba Province, Ollantaytambo District. Huajayhuillca lies southwest of Marconi.

References

Mountains of Peru
Mountains of Cusco Region